One Fine Day (Italian: Un certo giorno) is a 1968 Italian film written and directed by Ermanno Olmi. The film played at the 1969 New York Film Festival.

Plot 
Bruno, a Milanese advertising executive, kills an old peasant while en route to a company meeting. As he awaits his trial, the middle-aged man's life unfolds in a series of flashbacks, where he probes his relationships with his wife, his mistress, his employees, and his old boss, whose job he has just acquired.

Cast 
Brunetto Del Vita - Bruno

Lidia Fuortes -  Interviewer

Vitaliano Damieli - Counselor

Giovanna Caresca - Account Executive

Rafaele Modugno - Art Director

Maria Crosignani - Elena, wife of Bruno

References

External links 
 
 Review of One Fine Day by Vincent Canby in the New York Times, 1969

1968 films
1968 drama films
Italian drama films
Films directed by Ermanno Olmi
1960s Italian films